Krzeszów (pronounced   is a village in south-western Poland. It is part of the administrative district of Kamienna Góra County, Lower Silesian Voivodeship (formerly in Jelenia Góra Voivodeship). Krzeszów boasts the former Grüssau Abbey, one of the most valuable relics of Baroque architecture in Europe.

The village is located in the Zadrna valley of the Central Sudetes, within the historic Lower Silesia region. It has a population of 1,400.

History
The Benedictine abbey of Grissobor was established on 8 May 1242 by Anne of Bohemia, widow of Duke Henry II the Pious of Silesia. It was located on the rim of the Silesian Przesieka, probably at neighbouring Krzeszówek. At first a filial of the Bohemian Opatovice monastery, the estates were acquired by the Silesian duke Bolko I the Strict of Świdnica–Jawor in 1292, himself a grandson of late Duke Henry II, who brought Cistercian monks from nearby Henryków and endowed them with suitable assets at Krzeszów.

The 14th century was marked as a period of impressive development and vast influence of Krzeszów Abbey. Its estates comprised about 40 villages and the towns of Lubawka and Chełmsko. Meanwhile, upon the death of Duke Bolko II the Small in 1368, the time of the Świdnica–Jawor Piast line's extinction started its decline. The duchy was inherited by the Bohemian Crown and during the Hussite invasions and again during the Thirty Years' War, the abbey was totally destroyed and plundered. However, after the 1648 Peace of Westphalia, a new prosperous period for the abbey began.

Upon the First Silesian War, Grüssau with Silesia was annexed by Prussia in 1742. In 1810 the estates were secularised and from 1815 were part of the Silesia Province. In 1945 it was conquered by the Red Army in the course of the Vistula–Oder Offensive, upon the Potsdam Agreement, the area fell to the Republic of Poland and the remaining German population was expelled.

The abbey was resettled with Benedictine nuns, themselves expelled from Lviv in former Polish Kresy. The buildings include the Basilica of the Assumption of the Blessed Virgin Mary, the mausoleum of the Świdnica-Jawor Piasts, the Church of St. Joseph, the abbey buildings, a guest house called the 'House of the Abbot', numerous calvary chapels and household buildings.

External links

Krzeszów and suburbs
Krzeszów
Basilica of the Assumption of the Blessed Virgin Mary - spherical panorama
 Spherical panorama of Minor Basilica of the Assumption of the Virgin Mary
 Spherical panorama of Minor Basilica of the Assumption of the Virgin Mary
 Krzeszów - Grüssau na portalu polska-org.pl

Villages in Kamienna Góra County